Allier is a department in the Auvergne-Rhône-Alpes region that borders Cher to the west, Nièvre to the north, Saône-et-Loire and Loire to the east, Puy-de-Dôme to the south, and Creuse to the south-west. Named after the river Allier, it had a population of 335,975 in 2019. Moulins is the prefecture; Montluçon and Vichy are the subprefectures. Its INSEE and post code is 03.

Before 2018, the inhabitants of the department did not have a demonym. The inhabitants of the department have officially been known in French as Bourbonnais since 2018, a reference to the historic province of Bourbonnais. Until then, the unofficial term Elavérins had been used.

Geography 

Allier department is composed of almost all of the former Duchy of Bourbonnais. It is part of the Auvergne-Rhône-Alpes.

Principal communes

The most populous commune is Montluçon; the prefecture Moulins is the third-most populous. As of 2019, there are 5 communes with more than 10,000 inhabitants:

The department also includes the spa towns Bourbon-l'Archambault, Néris-les-Bains and Vichy.

Relief 
Bourbonnais bocage covers most of the western and central parts of the department (including the Forest of Tronçais), followed by the Bourbonnais Sologne in the east north-east, the Bourbonnais Mountain (near Vichy) which is the highest point of Bourbonnais together with Montoncel (peaking at 1,287 metres), and finally in the south of the department, the Bourbonnais Limagne, which extends from Varennes to Gannat, and is the breadbasket of the department.

The Bourbonnais Bocage
To the north and just over 500 metres above sea level, the Bourbonnais Bocage occupies one-third of the department, with two parts: the centre and the west (for the part between the Val de Cher and western boundaries of the territory). The bocage is especially remarkable for its rich forests and woodlands including the Forest of Tronçais but also the forests of Moladier Bagnolet, Civrais, Soulongis, Grosbois, Dreuille, Lespinasse and Suave.

Almost all of the southern area consists of Combrailles which is sometimes called High Bourbonnais, in an area that goes beyond the departmental boundaries of Creuse and Puy-de-Dôme. This area of the department rises to 778 metres at Bosse. The rivers Sioule, Bouble, and Cher have carved the most picturesque gorges in Allier.

The Bourbonnais Sologne
To the east, between the Val d'Allier and the borders of Nièvre and Saône-et-Loire, the Bourbonnais Sologne has a nice balance between pastures, crops, woods and ponds: the balance between agriculture and semi-wilderness constituting a very favorable setting for fauna and flora.

The Bourbonnais Mountains
In its southern extension, the Bourbonnais Mountain rises from the Puy Saint-Ambroise (442 metres) near Saint-Léon and then extends to the massif of Assise and the Black Woods at the edge of Puy-de-Dôme and Loire which is marked by the Puy de Montoncel (1,287 metres) – the highest point in Allier.

The Bourbonnais Limagne
Commonly grouped under the name of Val d'Allier, the Limagne and Forterre extend on both sides of the river between Vichy and Saint-Pourçain-sur-Sioule with an essential quality of fertility. Limogne, together with Sioule and Allier, is part of the Gannat / Escurolles / Saint-Pourçain triangle while Forterre covers the Canton of Varennes-sur-Allier ending near Jaligny.

Hydrography 

Watercourses
 to the west: the Cher
 in the centre: the Allier and its tributary the Sioule
 to the east the Loire and its tributary the Besbre

Climate 
A transition zone in the middle of the country, Allier is actually a free zone between north and south. The department is wide open to Atlantic influences and enjoys a mild and humid climate dominated by westerly winds which helps a little to differentiate it from other parts of Auvergne. The weather variances coincide with the diversity of Bourbonnais territory such as: flat regions, low altitude Bourbonnais Sologne and large floodplains, the hill country, the average altitude of 300 to 600 metres, the central part of the department, and the semi-mountainous southern townships bordering the Combraille and Forez between 700 and 1,200 metres.

There are two periods of maximum precipitation in June and October and a minimum in January and February with average of 694 millimetres in Montluçon (altitude 207 metres), 763 mm in Moulins (245 m), 778 mm in Vichy (251 m), 791 mm in Lapalisse (285 m) and nearly 1,200 mm in Assisi (1,050 m). As noted Atlantic winds are dominant from the west, northwest, or southwest. The influence of topography, especially in the valleys of Cher and Allier, also contributes to the south and north variance.

History 
The history of Allier corresponds to the Duchy of Bourbon (Bourbonnais) with which it shares almost the entire territory.

Allier is one of the original 83 departments created during the French Revolution on 4 March 1790. It was created from parts of the former provinces of Auvergne and Bourbonnais.

In 1940, the government of Marshal Philippe Pétain chose the town of Vichy as its capital. Vichy also became the department's second sub-prefecture in 1940, since the department now found itself split by the demarcation line between the occupied and (relatively, at least initially) free zones of France.

Heraldry

Demography 

On 1 January 2017 the population of Allier was estimated at 337,988 inhabitants which represented an average density of 46 people/km². Many areas have a density less than 20 people/km². Because of its low population density, it is considered to fall within the empty diagonal.

Since the early 1980s Allier has faced many demographic handicaps. The ratio of older people is important and with low fertility rates the natural growth is negative. Net migration was negative between 1968 and 1999, and slightly positive between 1999 and 2017.

Allier has three major cities: Montluçon, Vichy, and Moulins by size. The rest of the department includes some small towns and villages, scattered mainly along the rivers. The few villages are far from one another, and it is generally a sparsely-populated department. Until the end of the 19th century, however, the population was increasing because the development of its cities (industries at Montluçon and Moulins, spas in Vichy) compensated by the rural exodus. The department then passed 420,000 inhabitants. After losses of the First World War, the population stabilized and grew a little again in the 1960s. Since then, the continuing rural exodus and especially the decline of old industries has made the population decrease and age steadily, from 386,533 inhabitants in 1968 to 337,988 in 2017.

The population of the department is approximately equal of the country of Iceland.

Politics and administration

Prefecture 
Valérie Hatsch is prefect of Allier since 28 March 2022.

Jean-Luc Marx, the prefect of Lot, was named the prefect of Allier on 1 June 2011, replacing Pierre Monzani who was appointed Prefect of Seine-et-Marne on 25 May 2011.

Monzani had been prefect of Allier since 14 January 2009. Born on 12 May 1958 in Villerupt (Meurthe-et-Moselle), he holds a civil service agrégation in history and a DEA in history and civilization. A former student of the École Normale Supérieure (Saint-Cloud) and of École nationale d'administration (ENA), since August 2006 he has been director of INHES (National Institute of Advanced Security Studies).

Two senators 
After 2020 Senate elections, the two senators of Allier are Bruno Rojouan and Claude Malhuret.

In the Senate elections in 2008 the left took one of the two Senate seats in Allier formerly held by the right. Mireille Schurch, PCF Mayor of Lignerolles, was elected:

 Gérard Dériot DVD
 Mireille Schurch PCF

Representatives in the National Assembly 
The elections of 2007 returned three Socialists (Bernard Lesterlin for Montluçon, Jean Mallot for Saint-Pourçain, and Guy Chambefort for Moulins) and one PRG (Gérard Charasse for Vichy).

The current representatives are:

Departmental Council 

The current President of the Departmental Council is Claude Riboulet, elected in 2017. In the 2021 departmental election, the Departmental Council of Allier was elected as follows:

In the local elections of March 2008, Allier department was won by a majority of the left. The URB (Republican Union for Bourbonnais, right) had headed the department between 2001 and 2008, with the last year with only one vote majority. From 2008 the left coalition was in control also with a majority of one vote (10 PC, 6 PS, 2 PRG, 18 seats in total), facing 17 councilors from the URB.

History of the left in Allier 
The department was distinguished by communist votes in early voting which continued until after the Second World War with the two major political parties of the left being the PCF and the SFIO which have now become the Socialist Party.

The small town of Commentry has the distinction of being the first town in France to elect a socialist mayor in 1882: Christophe Thivrier. Another local figure, Pierre Brizon, an MP in 1910, was typically a member for sharecroppers.

Earlier, Ledru-Rollin achieved a very good result in 1848 (14%) with Democratic and socialist candidates in the following year (44% of the vote, against 35% for all of France). Similarly, resistance to the coup of 2 December 1851 was important after an attempt to support the uprising in June 1849. Republicans were in the majority in 1876 and held all six parliamentary seats. After neighbouring results of 15% of enrolled voters from 1893 to 1906 the Socialists rose to 31% of enrolled votes (42% of those cast) in 1910 and maintained this in 1914

Allier remains a land of rural communism (still 14.66% in the 2004 regional elections – the second best result for the party after Somme) in a sometimes difficult cohabitation with the Socialist Party.

For the causes of their success it may be noted that historically Allier has been a department where vast properties were combined into sharecropping. Sharecropping only spread in the 15th century and was not disturbed by the sale of national assets to the Revolution. In the 19th century large properties (100 hectares or more) occupied about half of the land, and even more than 70% in the north of the department. In the south, small properties dominate.

Sharecropping continued as a form of land development and it involved 40% of the land in 1892 (only 7% overall for France). Adverse conditions made sharecroppers promote the creation of rural unions between 1904 and 1911 (the third greatest number per department in France after Hérault and Landes). Despite poor results the mobilization was important and promoted the election of left-wing candidates.
 List of senators of Allier
 Communes of the Allier department

Economy 
The industries most represented are the food industry, wood and furniture, chemical, foundries and metalworking, rubber, machinery and electrical equipment, automotive, weaponry, textiles, building, and the spas.

According to studies by INSEE agriculture would be about 7 to 8% of departmental gross domestic product.

Tourism 
Marked by the imprint of the Dukes of Bourbon, Allier is a land of rivers, bocage, and small mountains. Landscapes such as Bourbonnais bocage, the gorges of the Sioule, and the Forest of Tronçais are places suitable for the practice of outdoor activities: hiking, fishing, and white water sports. Hydrotherapy is one of the leading sectors of Bourbonnais tourism with the international spa at Vichy.

This nature preserve also features over 500 castles, Romanesque churches and a number of houses which represent the heritage of the Bourbons. Bourbon cuisine reflects the history of the province and provides a number of local products, including Pâté aux pommes de terre, Charolais beef, wines from Saint-Pourçain AOC, Charroux mustard, and Vichy pastilles.

Among the tourist sites to visit are:
Monuments
 the Château de La Palice and its Renaissance chambered ceilings,
 the Bourbon-l'Archambault Castle, "Cradle of the Bourbons"

Churches and abbeys
 Moulins Cathedral and the triptych of the Virgin in glory
 the Priory Church of Saint Peter at Souvigny, more commonly called the "Saint-Denis" of the Bourbons
 the Abbey of Saint Vincent de Chantelle

Museums
 The National Centre of Stage Costume
 Maison Mantin in Moulins

Activities
 Le Pal, an amusement and animal park in Dompierre-sur-Besbre
 Paleopolis in Gannat, a site designed to understand life sciences and the earth through paleontology
 Three cities stand out:
 Moulins for its historical heritage from the 15th century
 Montluçon, a medieval and festive city dominated by its castle
 Vichy, an important spa town.

Gastronomy and viticulture 
The pâté aux pommes de terre is one of the specialities of the Allier, as well as of the neighboring Limousin region. The river Allier is one of the rare places in Southern Europe where the freshwater grayling (Thymallus thymallus), known in French as ombre des rivières, occurs in a natural habitat. This fish is much valued in French gastronomy for its fine and delicate texture and is best eaten along with a light wine.

Pompe aux grattons or brioche aux griaudes, a kind of brioche-like bread with cracklings, is a specialty of the Bourbonnais.

Saint-Pourçain AOC wine is produced in Allier and the oak from the forest of Tronçais is one of the most favoured in the construction of wine barrels.

Second homes 
In 2019 the quantity of dwellings in the department which were second homes was 7.3%. The table below shows the main communes of Allier with second homes and which exceed 10% of total housing.

The department has attracted many foreigners, English, Belgian, Swiss, and Dutch, and they have acquired many second homes. Therefore many communes have become "European", such as Pouzy-Mésangy, which today has many English and Swiss residents.

Culture

Sister Regions 
The Conseil Départemental of Allier co-operates with the following foreign administrative units:

  Niafunké (Mali) since 1988.
  Khemisset (Morocco) since 2009.
  Övörkhangai (Mongolia) since 2000.
  Cluj (Romania) since 2002.
  M'bour Department (Senegal) since 2016.
  Nguékhokh (Senegal) since 2002.

Regional languages 
Allier is traversed by the border between Occitan and French.

For a long period the people of Allier did not speak standard French but one of the following local languages:

 Bourbonnais: Dialect oïl, north of a line from Montluçon to Saint-Pourçain-sur-Sioule to Lapalisse
 Auvergnat: (a dialect of Occitan) in the extreme south
 the area between the two, sometimes called Bourbon d'oc is part of the Occitan Crescent, an area of mixing of French and Occitan considered by most linguists as Occitan with French pronunciation. Some consider the speech of the Crescent to be a full Occitan dialect and use the term Marchois.

Qualifications:

 Note that in the south-east of the department (notably in Forterre and the Bourbonnais Mountain) the influence of Francoprovencal arises.
 Similarly, in the north-west (and especially in the old part of the Bourbonnais department of Cher to Saint-Amand-Montrond), the Bourbon dialects are close to the Berrichon dialect.

See also 
 Arrondissements of the Allier department
 Cantons of the Allier department
 Communes of the Allier department
 List of intercommunalities of the Allier department

References

External links 

  Prefecture website
  Departmental council website
  

 
1790 establishments in France
Departments of Auvergne-Rhône-Alpes
Massif Central
States and territories established in 1790